Yazmín Rosita Rivas Hernandez is a Mexican professional boxer. She has held world championships in three weight classes, including the WBA female super flyweight title in 2005; the IBF female bantamweight title from 2011 to 2013; the WBC female bantamweight title from 2014 to 2016; and the WBA female super bantamweight title in 2018.

Professional career
Rivas made her professional debut on 9 November 2001, scoring a first-round technical knockout (TKO) victory against Angeles Mosso in Mexico.

After compiling a record of 7–2 (4 KOs), she defeated Martha Leticia Arevalo via ten-round unanimous decision (UD) to capture the vacant Mexican interim female bantamweight title on 21 August 2004, at the Palenque de la Expo in Ciudad Obregón, Mexico. Two judges scored the bout 100–93 and the third scored it 99–91.

In her next fight she faced Lucia Avalos for the inaugural WBA female super flyweight title on 28 February 2005, at the Palenque del Hipódromo de Agua Caliente in Tijuana, Mexico. Rivas captured her first world title via UD, with the judges' scorecards reading 99–91, 99–91 and 97–93.

Four fights later she moved up in weight to challenge for a second world championship, the WBC female bantamweight title, against reigning champion Kwang Ok Kim on 21 October 2005, at the Jungjuyoung Gymnasium in Pyongyang, North Korea. Rivas suffered the third defeat of her career, losing by UD over ten rounds.

Following the defeat she went on a five-fight winning streak before moving up another weight class to challenge Marcela Acuña for the WBC female super bantamweight title. The bout took place on 20 April 2007, at the Andes Talleres Sport Club in Godoy Cruz, Argentina. Rivas lost by UD, with one judge scoring the bout 100–88 and the other two scoring it 99–90.

Two fights later she suffered another defeat after moving up another weight class, losing by UD against WIBF featherweight champion Ina Menzer on 28 July 2007, at the Burg-Waechter Castello in Düsseldorf, Germany. The judges' scorecards read 100–90, 99–91 and 99–92.

Following two wins she faced Jackie Nava for the WBC interim female super bantamweight title, losing via UD on 17 May 2008, at the Plaza Monumental in Aguascalientes City, Mexico.

After two years out of the ring, Rivas returned to action in January 2010 to score a UD victory against Magdalena Leija before facing Zulina Muñoz for the vacant WBC Youth female bantamweight title. The bout took place on 27 March 2010 at the Deportivo Trabajadores del Metro in Mexico City, Mexico. Rivas suffered the seventh defeat of her career, losing by UD with the judges' scorecards reading 97–93,  97–93 and 96–94.

In 2011 she participated in the reality TV show Champions Challenge. Out of four bouts on the show, she scored three wins and a draw, all of which are listed by BoxRec as no contests as the events were not sanctioned by the Mexican boxing commission.

Following her appearance on Champions Challenge, Rivas defeated Gabriela Gonzalez via ninth-round corner retirement (RTD) on 14 July 2011, capturing the vacant NABF female flyweight title at Jose Cuervo Salon in Mexico City.

She next faced former world champion Susie Ramadan for the vacant IBF female bantamweight title on 15 October 2011, at the Centro Internacional de Convenciones in Chetumal, Mexico. Rivas defeated Ramadan via ten-round split decision (SD) to become a two-weight world champion. Two judges scoring the bout 97–93 in favour of Rivas while the third scored it 96–94 for Ramadan.

Following four successful defences of her title, she faced Jessica Gonzalez for the WBC interim bantamweight title on 2 November 2013, at the Auditorio General Arteaga in Querétaro, Mexico. Rivas suffered the eighth defeat of her career, losing via SD over ten rounds. Rivas' IBF title was not up for grabs.

She bounced back from this defeat with a UD victory against Calista Silgado on 18 January 2014, capturing the vacant WBC Silver female super bantamweight title at the Complejo Panamericano de Voleibol in Guadalajara, Mexico, before facing former world champion Alesia Graf for the vacant WBC female bantamweight title. The bout took place on 28 June 2014 at the Centro de Espectáculos in Epazoyucan, Mexico, with Rivas emerging the victor via ten-round UD. One judge scored the bout 99–91 and the other two scored it 98–90.

She successfully defended her title four times–including a rematch against Ramadan–before facing Catherine Phiri on 30 January 2016, at the Centro de Convenciones in Rosarito Beach, Mexico. The fight was stopped at the end of the sixth round, on advice from the ringside doctor, after Rivas suffered a cut from an accidental clash of heads, with the result relying in the judges' scorecards. Rivas was handed her ninth defeat, losing via technical decision (TD), with two judges scoring the six completed rounds 59–55 and 58–55 in favour of Phiri, while the third judge scored the bout even at 57–57.

She next fought Ana María Lozana for the vacant WBC interim female bantamweight title on 14 May 2016, at the Autonomous University of Tamaulipas, Mexico. The bout ended in a third-round technical draw after Rivas was again cut from an accidental clash of heads, leaving the WBC interim title vacant. 

She next had a rematch against Jessica Gonzalez on 27 August 2016, at the Palenque de la Feria in Gómez Palacio, Mexico, with the vacant WBC International female super bantamweight title on the line. Rivas evened the score with her former foe, winning via SD with two judges scoring the bout 96–94 and 96–94 in favour of Rivas while the third judge scored it 96–97 for Gonzalez. 

Following the win, she challenged four-weight world champion (now seven-weight champion) Amanda Serrano for Serrano's WBO female super bantamweight title. The bout took place on 14 January 2017 at the Barclays Center in New York City. In a fight which was the first English-language women's world title contest to be aired on national television in the U.S., Rivas suffered the tenth defeat of her career, losing via ten-round UD with the judges' scorecards reading 99–91, 98–92 and 97–93. According to CompuBox, Rivas landed 97 out of 332 power punches (29 percent) while Serrano landed 177 out of 431 (44 percent). 

After a UD victory against Nazly Maldonado in March 2017, Rivas won the WBC International title for a second time with a SD victory against Yareli Larios on 21 October at the Estadio Centenario in Cuernavaca, Mexico. 

In her next fight she challenged WBA female super bantamweight champion Liliana Palmera on 19 May 2018, at the Coliseo Miguel "Happy" Lora in Montería, Columbia. Rivas knocked the champion to the canvas in the fifth round. Palmera was able to make it back to her feet before the referee's count of ten only to be on the receiving end of a sustained attack, prompting the referee to call a halt to the contest, handing Rivas a fifth-round TKO victory to become a three-weight world champion.

Professional boxing record

References

External links

Year of birth missing (living people)
Date of birth missing (living people)
Living people
Mexican women boxers
Boxers from Coahuila
Sportspeople from Torreón
Flyweight boxers
Super-flyweight boxers
Bantamweight boxers
Super-bantamweight boxers
World super-flyweight boxing champions
World bantamweight boxing champions
World super-bantamweight boxing champions
International Boxing Federation champions
World Boxing Association champions
World Boxing Council champions